Robert John Russell is founder and Director of the Center for Theology and the Natural Sciences (CTNS). He is also the Ian G. Barbour Professor of Theology and Science in Residence at the Graduate Theological Union (GTU). He has written and edited extensively on possible scientific mechanisms of Christian belief.

Russell is an ordained minister in the United Church of Christ. He received a Ph.D. in physics from the University of California, Santa Cruz, a B.S. in physics from Stanford University, an M.S. in physics from UCLA, and an M.A. in Theology and an M. Div. from Pacific School of Religion. Russell taught physics at Carleton College and science and religion with Ian Barbour for several years before joining the GTU in 1981. His wife, Charlotte, is an associate minister at First Congregational Church, Berkeley, California.

Ideas
From 1984 to the present, Robert John Russell has published papers exploring consonance and dissonance between modern physics, evolutionary biology and Christian theology.

He is the Principal Investigator of "STARS: Science and Transcendence Advanced Research Series".

In God’s Action in Nature’s World: Essays in Honour of Robert John Russell, 15 writers on the interaction between theology and science analysed their views of Russell’s contribution to the subject.

Works

Editor

Coeditor
Scientific Perspectives on Divine Action (1996, 1997, 1999, 2000, and 2002)
Resurrection: Theological and Scientific Assessments (Eerdmans, 2002)
Theology and Science (journal)

References

Further reading
 Peters, Ted; Hallanger, Nathan (eds.) (2006). God’s Action in Nature’s World: Essays in Honour of Robert John Russell Aldershot: Ashgate. .

External links 
 CTNS Website
 Graduate Theological Union Website
 Biography of Dr. Robert John Russell

Graduate Theological Union
University of California, Santa Cruz alumni
Living people
United Church of Christ members
Pacific School of Religion alumni
Year of birth missing (living people)